"I Wonder" is a song by American hip-hop recording artist and record producer Kanye West. It was released as the fourth song on his third studio album Graduation (2007). The track was produced by West and retains influences from stadium rock, alternative music, and a variety of electronic-music subgenres. It contains a sample from "My Song" by British singer-songwriter, musician, and poet Labi Siffre. A key development in the song's creation was West touring the world the year prior with Irish rock band U2 on their Vertigo Tour. Afterwards, he sought out to compose a hip hop-oriented variation of "City of Blinding Lights," the band's 2005 single. The layered arrangement expresses ambitious orchestrations, with a distorted electronic synthesizer that acts as the driving melodic instrument. The maximalist synths are further supplemented with a sweeping string section as well as winding keyboards. Its experimental musical composition is also notable for West's rapping technique. His lyrical delivery features a fragmented, forceful flow where he raps minimalist verses in an intense staccato vocal style. Lyrically, "I Wonder" is an introspective number, containing a blend of melancholic yet inspirational lines that discuss finding one's dreams.

The song received general acclaim from contemporary music critics, who hailed it as an album highlight. Even though it did not enter charts, the album track has become a cult classic amongst fans and listeners. West himself actually cited "I Wonder" as one of his top three favorite songs from Graduation. At one point, he even contemplated releasing "I Wonder" as the albums' fourth single, but subsequently chose "Flashing Lights" in its place. Nevertheless, "I Wonder" has since been certified double Platinum by the Recording Industry Association of America (RIAA). Although an accompanying music video was never produced for "I Wonder," a special video clip was made for the track. The video clip premiered during an album listening session West held for Graduation at the New World Stages in New York City. It was one of seven clips that were designed by West and edited by film editor Derrick Lee exclusively for the event. The video clip for "I Wonder" features a montage of scenes from the 1982 science fiction film Tron. West performed the song on the set-list on his worldwide Glow in the Dark Tour (2008).

Background

"I Wonder" was written and produced by American hip-hop recording artist and record producer Kanye West. It was included as the fourth song on the track-listing of his third studio album, Graduation (2007). Although the composition was originally intended to be the album's opening number. The experimental hip-hop production of "I Wonder" represents a musical progression from the sound of West's past work. Its musical style demonstrates a distinctly European aesthetic, introducing diverse elements and influences from stadium rock, alternative music and various forms of electronic-music, all while maintaining its hip-hop essence. Kanye West claimed that more than any other song from his third album, "I Wonder" was the most directly influenced by the Irish rock band U2. After spending the previous year touring the world with the band on their Vertigo Tour, he became inspired by witnessing lead singer Bono open stadium concerts each night to incredible ovations. West then sought out to compose rap songs which could operate just as effectively in similar live venues. During the recording and production of Graduation, West designed tracks in such a way that they would function well when performed in large stadiums and arenas. With "I Wonder" in particular, West intended to create a hip-hop-oriented variation of the rock band's 2005 single "City of Blinding Lights." The song made its live debut on the Vertigo Tour and was used as the opener of the concert set-list.

Prior to the release of his third studio album, West frequently spoke of the desire to write anthemic lyrics that listeners could connect to and personalize with, and "I Wonder" epitomizes this ethos. The song's lyrical content is introspective in nature, as West paints a portrait of his reflective thoughts. His philosophical lyrics talk about chasing after dreams and address his rise to fame. In regards to songwriting, West disclosed that he simplifies some of his lyricism on "I Wonder." On Graduation, he reconditioned his lines to be simpler, more direct, and more autobiographical in order to make them more accessible to listeners and appeal to the broadest audience possible.

For the track, West adopted a slower, fragmented flow to deliver his emotional lyrics. He used similar choppy rapping styles throughout most of the lyrical content on Graduation. He realized after touring with the English rock band The Rolling Stones on their A Bigger Bang concert tour that he could not captivate audiences as well with his most complex lyricism and technical rapping. During an album listening party, West jokingly explained, "I'd be saying my super-raps, and this 50-year-old white lady would be looking like, 'I can’t wait till the Rolling Stones come on.'" He elaborated that it was a conscious effort not to overexert his rapping on Graduation. West imparted that he felt he too often did so in the past on songs such as "Diamonds from Sierra Leone," the lead single of his sophomore effort, Late Registration (2006). West stated that on his third studio album, he made the decision to cease trying so hard to prove himself as a rapper.

Recording 

"I Wonder" was recorded in three different recording studios: The Record Plant and Henson Recording Studios in Hollywood, California, and at Sony Music Studios in New York City. Once the recording sessions were complete, the track was then mixed at the Legacy Recording Studios in New York City. "I Wonder" is representative of West's stylistic shift in his approach to record production on his third studio album. The music of Graduation had mainly been informed by West experiences touring with the rock bands U2 and The Rolling Stones. West had accompanied Irish rock band U2 as a supporting act for several dates of their Vertigo Tour in 2005 and 2006. He would watch the band open concerts with their 2005 single "City of Blinding Lights" to rapturous applause, observe how the band's epic, melodic sound filled stadiums, and then sought out to replicate the effect on "I Wonder." The song's swelling, anthemic energy is the result of West's channeling the legacy of the rock bands in an attempt to attain a "stadium-status" for his music. In addition to U2 and The Rolling Stones, West also turned the focus of his attention and listening habits towards synth-driven mainstream rock bands such as The Killers, Keane, Radiohead and Coldplay as well as the electronic duo Daft Punk.

To further achieve his "stadium-status" endeavor, West stretched out his production by integrating heavy, layered electronic synthesizers at loud volumes into his hip-hop beats. He fashioned the chord sequence that carries during the song's verses with the use of distorted synth-chords. The layered synthesizers West chose expresses a maximalist aesthetic, were directly inspired by U2's "City of Blinding Lights" and further align with the "stadium status" description he uses on "Big Brother," which bears a similar instrumentation. The liberal use of synthesizers for "I Wonder" is a trait that the recording shares with nearly every track on Graduation, which served as West's foray into electronic-music. West incorporated a wide variety of audio effects into his production, particularly distortion, feedback, dissonance and reverberation. The inclusion of these audio components, in addition to modulated electronic noises and rich keyboard tones, contributed towards a harder, denser sonic textures. West would continue experimenting with abrasive, electronic production on subsequent records, most prominently with the industrial-inspired albums Yeezus and The Life of Pablo.

In an interview, West stated that among his primary objectives on his third studio album Graduation was for his drums to "bang harder in stadiums". A newfound fascination with house-music had an influence on this endeavor to achieve stronger drum beats. West relied less on his signature shuffling rhymthic patterns and placed more emphasis on clipped electro tones, giving his programmed beats more of a punch. The highly pronounced rhythm section of "I Wonder" is structured on a combination of thumping boom-bap bass drum and pounding breakbeats. West buried his snares and kick drums deep beneath the decomposing layers of synths into the bottom of the mix. The snare drum that West uses for "I Wonder" was reportedly heard while he was shopping for furniture at Moss. West was quite meticulous, spending many weeks and roughly ten different recording sessions working on the drum track alone. Yet another stylistic shift West made in his pursuit of sing-along stadium anthems came in his approach to rapping over these beats. When recording his vocals, West placed a significant amount of concentration on speaking at high volumes with fewer words. Inspired by arena tours, he decided to shed his more technical verse-raps in favor of anthemic sloganeering that tens of thousands of fans could chant in unison at concerts. West's sparse array of vocals were also treated with processing, as his staccato delivery is laden with echos. For the track, West utilizes a simplified, halting vocal delivery that is both "electrifying" and "punchy".

Despite its experimental nature, "I Wonder" still happens to be one of a handful of tracks from Graduation which harbor certain characteristics of West's once trademark musical style. It features a soulful vocal sample from the 1972 recording "My Song" by British singer-songwriter, musician, and poet Labi Siffre. Alongside the nostalgic sample, the orchestration includes elegant piano and lush strings in addition to layered synths. West continued invoking his habit of layering keys and strings in order to coax the melodies out of samples. The track's keyboards were played by Late Registration collaborator Jon Brion and a full string section was incorporated into the layered, synth-heavy mixes. The lilting melody of the Labi Saffri sample works in tandem with the anthemic ambiance of the lush orchestration and layers of warm yet swelling synths, all over the booming, delay-heavy drums.

Although it retains a soulful sample, "I Wonder" is demonstrative of how the majority of the songs on Graduation don't express the "chipmunk-soul" once a hallmark of West's productions in the past. West's debut as a hit-making record producer on The Blueprint in 2001 popularized a distinctive hip-hop production technique which involved manipulating the pitch and tempo of vocal samples from classic soul records. West's influential production work on the acclaimed studio album was responsible for helping to revatlize Jay-Z's career and he would later apply some of the soul-based sampling techniques used on The Blueprint into his own solo releases. But over time, West chose to depart from this signature sound and progressively explore different musical avenues. The minor presence of soul samples on Graduation with tracks such as "I Wonder" and "The Glory" served merely to act as a holdover as to not alienate West's core audience unprepared for his increasingly experimental sonic approach. Though he continued to use looped vocal samples on his third album, West now gleaned them before pushing them underneath the synths, causing their voices to sound trapped within a machine. Furthermore, instead of being high-pitched, sped-up and chopped-up, the Labi Saffi sample for "I Wonder" is used disarmingly straight.

Release

"I Wonder" was first heard by music listeners when the digital radio station BBC Radio 1Xtra hosted an exclusive "Audience With Kanye West" venue at the BBC Radio Music Theatre in London, England on August 13, 2007. It was while West was on an extensive promotional campaign for his third studio album during a trip to the United Kingdom. There West guided a specially selected audience through Graduation, playing the album in its entirety directly from his Mac laptop via a speaker system and eventually came across the track. Kanye West first performed "I Wonder" live before an audience of well over five hundred fans and invited guests at a concert that he held in secret with Barbadian recording artist Rihanna in London, England on August 20, 2007. The intimate secret concert was held at the Methodist Central Hall in the City of Westminster, with the location of the show being just opposite of the Houses of Parliament. West was the latest musician to be sponsored by the mobile phone companies Vodafone and Sony Ericsson for their ongoing series of one-time gigs all around England. The vast majority of the audience at the small venue was competition winners and music industry insiders. The guests were greeted by staff members wearing graduation robes as well as academic caps in reference to the title of West's third studio album, Graduation.

A week later, "I Wonder" was one of the tracks that West played while hosting an album listening session for Graduation in New York City. The late-night album listening session was held at the New World Stages on August 28, 2007. Inside an auditorium, West explained the influences and aspirations that went into the making of his third studio album. Throughout the night, he played previews of its songs from start-to-finish without interruption, some with video accompaniment to match. In an October interview with Concrete Loop, West imparted that "I Wonder" was one of his most favorite tracks from Graduation. He stated, "My favorite three songs are 'Flashing Lights,' 'Homecoming' and 'I Wonder'. Now, 'I Wonder' is more of an emotional pull. 'I Wonder' and 'Homecoming' are both very emotional, but 'I Wonder' has that stadium thing to it and that has one of my favorite pieces of music: the third verse, the breakdown, when the strings come in." West even went as far to contemplate releasing "I Wonder" as the fourth single for Graduation. However, West subsequently chose to instead release "Flashing Lights," which he describes as the album's "coolest" track.

Composition 
"I Wonder" is a mid-tempo hip hop song that lasts for a duration of four minutes and three seconds (4:03). The song incorporates elements similar to that of traditional R&B and classic soul music in addition to influences from stadium rock and subgenres of electronic-music including electro, house, and rave music. Its downbeat instrumentation consists of an immense orchestra which sees a combining of West's trademark strings, piano, and samples along with abrasive synths and a distorted drumbeat. An experimental track, "I Wonder" features a stop-and-start arrangement with gradual, melodic cadence and a stuttering rhythm. West's simplistic yet forceful rapping makes extensive use of rests as the song builds into a bombastic crescendo. Over the course of his three verses, West showcases an untraditional approach to cadence for his leaner rhyme schemes. With a halting delivery, West manipulates his vocal articulation in order to match the melodies of the musical composition. He initially delivers his lyrics in terse phrases at loud volume and high velocity with an intense staccato style in between a vocal sample from "My Song" by British singer and poet Labi Siffre. He enunciates and stresses each syllable in every word within the first minimalist staccato verse, then transitions to a faster, more fluid flow for the more intricate second and third verses. West routinely stops his full-throated rapping and allows the sample, strings and pianos to wander indistinctly for measures at a time.

Its musical composition begins at a medium tempo with a graceful, intricate introduction. The track's intro is steeped in lilting melody, consisting of twinkling piano keys and a soft vocal sample from "My Song" by Labi Siffre. Suddenly, the off-kilter, dreamlike composition erupts, abruptly unleashing an overdriven electronic synthesizer. "I Wonder" opens with West proclaiming, "I've been waiting for this moment my whole life," accompanied by a sinuous synth-lead over crunchy drumbeats. Its distorted snare drum strokes, crashing rimshots, and a bottom-heavy kick drum combine to form the track's breakbeats. The discordant synthesizer gives off roaring feed-back and intertwines with the melody of the sample, which evolves over the duration of the song to transform into an anthemic, piano-driven refrain. A torrent of dissonant synths undulate as they are ornamented with ethereal keyboard lines and throbbing bass. Following the second verse, the synths retract as the song adopts a heavy string section. The operatic strings mimics the melodies of the synthesizer and the vocal sample. At the start of the third verse, the strident synth-lead and later on the piercing drum strokes and rumbling kick drums make their return. Towards its end, the musical composition enters an energetic breakdown. During this period, its snares, kick drums, and keyboards are brought to the forefront before the lush orchestration finish off with a sweeping string arrangement.

The lyrical content of "I Wonder" contains introspection regarding dream chasers, being melancholic in tone. The song features a chorus that pertains to discovering one's elusive dreams. During the verses, West depicts the struggle others experience to figure out their lives. The dark, intimate track is where West finds himself alternating from anguished soul-searching to swaggering bravado over the lush orchestration. West varies his highly emotive style of rapping in order to convey the struggle a person goes through in the pursuit to determine the meaning behind their life. During the song's first two verses, when West is in difficult relationship, his rapping unnatural and staggering. But for the third and final verse, when the relationship has been seemingly severed, West returns to his confident demeanor and usual cadence. His lyrics throughout the track engage in a poignant discussion that talks about the burden of expectations as well as struggle in a relationship from an honest perspective. All of which West acknowledges that he once went through before he figured out his own life and found his own dreams. He also takes the time to address the negative criticism that was directed towards him along the way. West ponders on the prospect of achieving success by staying true to one's own unique disposition, while utilising the sample as a hook to ask the existential question, "And I wonder if you know what it means to find your dreams?"

Some music journalists noted a sense of melancholia in the track's lyrical content and delivery that were at odds with its aspirational themes. To Hillary Crosley from Billboard, West's primary goal was to place lyrical focus on individual inspiration: "I've been waiting on this my whole life/You can still be what you wish you is, that's what intuition is." However, Greg Kot of Chicago Tribune detected that at the heart of the song lies a crept-in hint of self-doubt: "And I wonder if you know what it all means?" Todd Williams from The Boombox remarked that West sounds as if he's in mired in disbelief regarding his accomplishments in his career and life. Jesal Padania for RapReviews.com concludes that the song's ambivalent lyricism serves to loosely document the miscommunication between West and everyone else around him, while its multiple buzz-lines and his liberal use of Shakespearian open text function to hook the listener in: "Do you even remember what the issue is?" 411Mania reviewer Sean Comer commented on the storytelling abilities that West exhibited. He states, "Kanye always delivers his stories in compelling fashion – it’s just that he’s writing what he knows: his life, triumphs, travails and all. In reality, this was assessment on the state of his fame. Sometimes, it's from a place of bemusement and others, a contemplative resting place."

Critical reception

"I Wonder" received general acclaim from contemporary music critics, many of whom considered it a main highlight of Graduation. Los Angeles Times music critic Ann Powers was intrigued by West's performance, saying that he "treats the soulful Labi Siffre sample on "I Wonder" like a punching bag, his staccato delivery undermining the lyrics' Don Juan come-ons." Comparing it to the single "Flashing Lights," Alex Swhear from Uproxx described the track as "minimalist in its sparse vocals but intimate and emotionally affecting." Washington Post staff writer J. Freedom du Lac lists "I Wonder" as one of the four best tracks from Graduation. CraveOnline ranked "I Wonder" as one of Kanye West's fifteen best songs, writing, "It’s hard to understand how a song with such a chopped off, aggressive flow can be so inspiring and motivating. One of those Graduation tracks that is certain to give you goose ... Signature vocal-instrumental is illuminating as one can get, and while it’s not one of the more popular tracks of Kanye's best album, it’s certainly a hidden gem." Sharing similar sentiments, Mark Pytlik for Pitchfork Media and AllMusic's Andy Kellman both cite "I Wonder" as one of the immediate highlights of the third album, with Pytlik calling the song "stunning."

Louis Pattison from New Musical Express gave an assessment of West's musical style, saying, "As well as Daft Punk, Kanye claims he’s been listening to Thom Yorke's The Eraser and you can hear these influences – synthesizers, electronic, but soulful – all over this record. The opening ‘I Wonder’ sees Kanye announcing “I’ve been waiting for this moment my whole life” over zig-zagging keyboards and crunchy Game Boy beats. Commenting on its twinkling keys and hiccuping breakbeats, the music magazine The FADER hailed the composition as the album's "most timeless artifact."
 Prefix Magazine'''s Jesse Manne remarked, "Bursting with operatic string sections and much-talked-about synths, the production on Graduation is truly remarkable. Even on the melancholy numbers, such as the piano-led "I Wonder," West turns it out with a crashing beat and winding keys." Japie Stoppelenburg of No Ripcord described the heavy electronic aestheic of the hip-hop production as "surprising." He favorably compares its abrasive synth-driven instrumentation to that of the studio album's thirteenth track, "Big Brother."

In a review of Graduation, Greg Kot, music critic for Chicago Tribune, stated that "I Wonder" serves to "amps up the soul-fired feel of West’s early productions to stadium-rap levels." Writing for contactmusic.com, after panning the album's second single "Stronger" as the "low-point" of Graduation, Ben Davis turns around to compliment "I Wonder." He asserts that its instrumental exemplifies how the album's "superior moments come when West's production really cuts loose on more experimental sounds" and voiced his approval of the manner in which he "manages to take a Labi Siffre sample and make it sound positively alien." Likewise, Paste magazine expressed fascination with the way that West experiments with unconventional song structure. He stated that "the sample of "My Song" by Labi Siffre does get a bit insistent, but it's overpowered by Kanye's interesting song construction." Regarding West's use of sampling for the record production, Kevin Jones for exclaim! wrote, "Where traditional samples are concerned, Kanye transforms more than a few gems into some of the disc’s more enveloping moments, the most prominent being the beautiful Labi Siffre material that serves as the foundation for the catchy "I Wonder.” 411Mania's Mitch Michaels lauded the track, saying, "After all is said and done, West proves his star power on not just the obvious hit singles, but also on the album cuts. Tracks like the nostalgic “I Wonder” prove why Kanye West is one of the most talented beatmakers and hitmakers in hip-hop today."Rolling Stone music journalist Nathan Brackett opined, "As a lyricist, West will never possess the pure cool or formal mastery of his mentor Jay-Z, but he's grown as a songwriter." Calling the record a "stomping synth-soul track," Chicago Reader writer Miles Raymer also voiced his appreciation for West's songwriting progression. He observed that "I Wonder" stands as a prime example of the manner in which West was "relying less on old-school beat-and-one-sample combos and more on layered arrangements that camouflage his borrowings. This new subtlety reminds me of Portishead--[West] shows how samples can be used to expand his music's vocabulary." Likewise, Rajveer Kathwadia for RWD Magazine regards West's musicality on the track as the true measurement of his talent, saying the orchestration take center stage over his improvement as a rapper. He continued by writing, "Kanye the rapper doesn’t match the quality of Kanye the producer as he uses some disjointed flow" but nevertheless labeled "I Wonder" as probably his most favorite track from Graduation and an "immaculate piece of music."

Nick Marx of the webzine Tiny Mix Tapes claims that "critics of Kanye's staggered half-rhymes will find ample fodder here, but the track's real downfall is its scrap-heap Neptunes synthesizers." Jesa Padania from RapReviews expresses disappointment that on "I Wonder," West misses an opportunity for "delivering a beautiful and impassioned plea." He critiques that West "so squarely aims for 'stadium anthem' territory that by the end of the song, forgets about us and our 'everyman' struggles, instead falling back on his blustery bravado." Jake Boyer of Highsnobiety stated that "shows of lyrical dexterity aren’t enough to transform this track into the memorable slow-ballad 'I Wonder' tries so hard to be." Concluding that "things just aren’t clicking into place" with the track, he faulted its placement on the album in between two of the strongest pop-leaning singles.

Commercial performance
On June 15, 2018, "I Wonder" was certified Gold by the Recording Industry Association of America (RIAA) for sales of half a million paid digital downloads. At the time, it stood as the only track on the entire studio album that managed to be certified without debuting on record charts in the absence of an official single release (since then, "Champion" and "Everything I Am" have been certified platinum and gold on September 23, 2020, respectively).

Music video
Even though "I Wonder" doesn't have an accompanying music video, a special video clip was created for the track prior to the release of Graduation. It was displayed for the very first time when Kanye West hosted a late-night album listening session for Graduation in New York City on August 28, 2007, at the New World Stages. The video clip for "I Wonder" was one of seven that were designed by Kanye West and Derrick Lee exclusively for the event. Derrick Lee was the editor of the music video for "Flashing Lights" and was able to edit all seven video clips in the span of three days. West presented the gapless playback session inside an auditorium with an evocative light-show across a stage that featured theatrical smoke machines, laser beams, stage spotlights and other special effects. The elaborate spectacle was all set in almost perfect time with the music. While the music played, a large screen positioned in the middle of the stage flashed a sequence of images edited to sync up with "I Wonder." They are taken from scenes of the 1982 science fiction film Tron. Kanye West later made the video clip available for viewing on his official blog on March 24, 2008. In the blog entry, Kanye stated that the video clip for "I Wonder" may be his most favorite out of all the other video clips that were made for some of the songs from Graduation and displayed the night of the album listening session.

Live performances

Kanye West performed "I Wonder" for the very first time before an audience of over five hundred fans and invited guests during an intimate secret show with Barbadian singer Rihanna. The show was held at Methodist Central Hall, just opposite of the Houses of Parliament, on August 20, 2007, in London, England. For the concert, West wore a black jacket, grey tracksuit bottoms, sunglasses and white tennis shoes. After a false start, West leapt onto the stage and began the secret show with a live performance of "I Wonder." He was accompanied by a twenty-one piece all-female string orchestra, background vocalists, a keyboardist and his tour DJ A-Trak. The twenty-one women were all draped in plastic dresses while their faces were colored in with fluorescent cosmetic face paint. At the end of the concert, a shower of silver confetti and ticker tape reading Touch the Sky fell from the ceiling onto the audience as "Touch the Sky," the fourth single from West's previous studio album Late Registration, was played on the speakers.

While instrumentally backed by a sixteen-piece band, West performed "I Wonder" for a benefit concert promoting and raising funds for higher education. The concert was sponsored by West's charity foundation and was held on August 24, 2007, at Chicago's House of Blues. One of the initiatives funded by the concert is the Loops Dreams Teacher Training Institute, which encourages the incorporation of hip-hop into Chicago Public Schools curriculum. Wearing an untucked white shirt, a purple cardigan, jeans and a pair of sunglasses, West performed "I Wonder" as the opener of his ninety-minute set. After about a minute, West abruptly paused the track and walked off-stage. He returned three minutes later to perform a string of hit singles from his first two studio albums, starting with "Diamonds from Sierra Leone," the lead single of his sophomore album Late Registration. West restarted "I Wonder" later on and at one point even played a few chords on an upright piano. During a soundcheck prior to start of the charity concert, West met with well over 200 of the local students. West also gave the audience members a sneak peek of the early production stages of his forthcoming Glow in the Dark Tour. In a review of the concert, Chicago Tribune music critic Greg Kot wrote that he was taken aback by the sudden halt of "I Wonder." He also thought West's piano playing was under-rehearsed and felt the arrangement was not as fully realized as the song's recorded version. However, Kot still praised the live rendition of "I Wonder" and remarked that West's performance "aspired to stadium-rap heights."

The track was included as the second live performance within the set list of Kanye West's Glow in the Dark Tour, which began on April 16, 2008, at the KeyArena in Seattle, Washington. The composition is but one of the many, various songs taken from West's first three studio albums that West uses for his conceptual concert. They serve to form a space opera storyline that details the story (tale?) of how a stranded space traveler struggles for over a year making attempts to escape from a distant planet while on a mission to bring creative back to Earth. In the narrative, West plays an astronaut who performs the song after talking with his robotic on-board computer Jane once his spacecraft crashes onto an unknown planet.

"I Wonder" was among a list of songs that West performed during a 90-minute set when he headlined the annual dance music festival Global Gathering on July 25, 2008, becoming the very first hip-hop artist to do so. We’re teased with a snippet of ‘Stronger’, but after appearing in a puff of smoke, Kanye opts to regale us with ‘I Wonder’ and ‘Heard ’Em Say’. West was accompanied by backup singers, a disc jockey and three pairs of drums while the concert featured a liberal use of lighting and smoke effects. West gave a rare live performance of "I Wonder" when he headlined the iconic Pyramid Stage at Glastonbury Festival on June 27, 2015, in the United Kingdom. Kanye West's cousin, soul singer Tony Williams, stepped forward from the back of the stage to sing the vocal sample melody. Rolling Stone writer Daniel Kreps describes the live rendition as one of the "unexpected gems" from the concert's thirty-song set list.

Cover versions 

"I Wonder" has been covered and remixed by other hip-hop artists. A remix for "I Wonder" was produced by Baltimore club pioneer Scottie B for inclusion on Sky High, a remix mixtape that was mixed and compiled by DJ Benzi and Plain Pat. The mixtape features remixes by various DJs and record producers of songs taken from West's first three studio albums. It was made in anticipation of the release of his fourth studio album 808s & Heartbreak. The remix project was commissioned by Kanye West himself the year prior. He handed over a cappellas and other session tapes to DJ Benzi, who then spent his time trying to match different and DJs and producers to certain tracks. Like every of the other tracks, "I Wonder" (Scottie B Remix) had at least five revisions recorded before being completely finished. The song's instrumental was given a new club-friendly, dance-oriented vibe.

In a manner similar, "I Wonder" was remixed by Terry Urban and included on The Graduate, a collaborative remix mixtape hosted by West. Terry Urban composed the mixtape alongside fellow DJs and record producers Mick Boogie and 9th Wonder. For the remix, he incorporates the second verse of the song "Life's a Bitch" by the Queensbridge rapper Nas, taken from his classic debut album, Illmatic. Harlem hip-hop artist Charles Hamilton has used various portions of "I Wonder" for his music on multiple occasions. His songs "Independent Woman," "My Wonderful Pink Polo," and "Wonderful Wondering" all contain samples and elements of the musical composition. The song was covered in its entirety by GOOD Music recording artist Big Sean in honor of the ten-year anniversary of Graduation. Big Sean performed the live cover rendition of "I Wonder" for BBC Radio 1Xtra Live Lounge during the promotion of his fourth studio album, I Decided.

Legacy

Though it was never released as a single, nor did it enter record charts, "I Wonder" has since gone on to become a cult classic amongst fans and listeners. The musical composition has also left a profound impact on other recording artists and musicians. In an interview with The Guardian, while making a list of his most influential songs, the Atlanta musician Raury describes "I Wonder" as the song that helped kickstart his career. Raury elaborated that Graduation was one of the first albums he ever purchased, and that its songs played an important role in shaping his early beginnings. At the age of nine, Raury was deeply inspired by "I Wonder" in particular and wrote his very first rhymes that he later went on to rap to his manager over the track's instrumental. He imparted, "This was around the same age: nine was a pivotal age for me, I was diving into music. I didn’t even really know who Kanye was, but I bought the album because I liked the bears and the artwork. And I just love music about the imagination and becoming more than who you are. I wrote a verse to it at the age of 14 that I would later rap to my manager, Justice [Baiden], that convinced him to manage me. This song has stuck with me, I still play it today."

During an interview with Big Boy’s Neighborhood on Los Angeles radio station Power 106, the Canadian rapper Drake was asked to make a list of songs and verses  from other artists of any genre that he wishes he himself recorded. At one point, Drake cites "I Wonder" as one clear example. Other hip-hip artists such as Vic Mensa and Kyle have also stated that "I Wonder" is their favorite song from Graduation and regaled fond memories of listening to it and the rest of the record. American entertainer Donald Glover — better known as his stage name Childish Gambino — paid lyrical homage to "I Wonder" on the track "We Ain't Them" from his sixth mixtape R O Y A L T Y.

Personnel
Information taken from Graduation'' liner notes.
Songwriters: Kanye West, Labi Siffre
Producer: Kanye West
Recorders: Greg Koller, Andrew Dawson, Anthony Kilhoffer
Mix engineer: Andrew Dawson
Assistant engineers: Bram Tobey, Jason Agel, Nate Hertweck, Dale Parsons
Piano/synths: Omar Edwards
Keyboards: Jon Brion
Violins: Emma Kummrow, Igor Szwec, Gloria Justen, Olga Konopelsky, Luigi Mazzocchi, Charles Parker
Violas: Peter Nocella, Alexandra Leem
Cello: Jennie Lorenzo
Bass: Tim Ressler
Strings conduction: Larry Gold

Certifications

References

External links

"I Wonder" lyrics at MTV

2007 songs
Kanye West songs
Songs written by Kanye West
Song recordings produced by Kanye West